Carmel College (formerly Carmel RC College) is a secondary school on The Headlands in Hummersknott, Darlington, England. It also has a sixth form, Carmel College Sixth Form admitting about 150 students each year. Following an OFSTED inspection in 2013, Carmel was graded as outstanding in all categories. It is part of the Bishop Hogarth Catholic Education Trust (formerly Carmel Education Trust)  which includes 35 schools in the North East Region.

The current principal is Melanie Kane.

Admissions
Carmel College is the town's only Catholic secondary school. It has four main feeder schools at Primary level. These are St Teresa's RC Primary, St Bede's RC Primary, St Augustine's RC Primary and Holy Family RC Primary. There is also another school, Abbey Road Junior School, which feeds Carmel; although this school is not Catholic, it is local to Carmel. Carmel also has a sixth form.

Carmel College has eight forms which consist of C, A, R, M, E, L  and J, P (from former Pope John Paul II) with three houses St. Aidans, St. Bedes and St. Cuthberts.

History
It began life as St Mary's Grammar School, a boys' grammar school, becoming comprehensive and co-educational in September 1974 when it merged with the Immaculate Conception Grammar School, a girls' Catholic grammar school.

The modern-day "St. Mary's" building, also known as Hummersknott House, has long been rumoured to be haunted by the college ghost, Harriet.

The John Caden Hall was opened by former Prime Minister of the United Kingdom Tony Blair in 2004, and is named after Father John Caden, who died in 2013.

Carmel underwent a multimillion-pound building project, completed in 2008, which included three brand new teaching blocks and the refurbishment of many of the old facilities. Carmel also upgraded its Sixth Form facilities; expanding the common room and providing a learning resource centre in the schools library. This was carried out in Summer 2010, and opened the following school year.

Tony Blair paid his last school visit as Prime Minister in 2007 at Carmel before he resigned, officially opening the brand-new "Newton" building housing the Physics, Chemistry and Biology Departments, including 8 laboratories.

The campus went through a further transformation in the school year 2012/2013 involving the full reconstruction of the schools "Upper" dining hall with new classrooms placed above which were required due to the schools recent expansion to 8 "form" groups per year-groups. The new dining Hall included new flat-screen televisions and a new glass wall between the dining hall and the lower floor of the schools library. The upgrade also included the replacement of the roof on the school library and reception building and a major refurbishment of the schools Gym located near to the Music Department and the Science "Newton" Block.

On 1 November 2011, Carmel RC College was officially closed, and Carmel College: A Catholic Academy was opened, as the school converted to an academy on this date. The school was named in July 2019 as a computing hub for the National Centre for Computing Education.

In 2021, A multimillion pound development project was initiated creating a new building over the old stable and connected to the sports hall to create a brand new sixth form centre which will consist of stay areas and a state-of-the-art fitness centre alongside a production suite overlooking the sports hall. The project was delayed due to the COVID-19 pandemic, however was opened in mid 2022.

Academic performance
The GCSE exam results of 2012 were the best to date, having 100% of students getting at least 5 A*-C GCSE certificates (95% including English and Mathematics). The A-level pass rate was 99%
at A2, with 52% achieving the highest grades of A*, A or B. The average point score was of 1030 points per student.

Accreditations
Carmel College is the Lead school in Carmel Teacher Training Partnership, an accredited ITT provider, training teachers for Qualified Teacher Status QTS in both primary and secondary schools through SCITT and [School Direct]. Carmel College was recognised in its most recent (as of 2020) Ofsted inspection as Outstanding in all categories in 2013. Carmel College was accredited as a 'Teaching School' in April 2012. However, The Government and DfE launched a new teaching school hub programme in September 2021 and Carmel College Teaching Alliance has now rebranded as Carmel Professional Training Centre (CPTC).

Notable former pupils

St Mary's Grammar School
 Sir John Smith CBE (1933–40)
 Oswald O'Brien, former Labour MP for Darlington from March–June 1983 (1939–46)
 Colin Atkinson CBE, former President of Somerset CCC (1942–49)
 Adrian Raine D. Phil (York) psychologist. Chair, Richard Perry University Professor of Criminology and Psychiatry & University of Pennsylvania. (1965–72)

Carmel RC College
 Zoe Birkett, Pop Idol finalist and runner up, West End performer.
 Tom Craddock, ex professional football player.

References

External links 
 Carmel College
 EduBase

Catholic secondary schools in the Diocese of Hexham and Newcastle
Educational institutions established in 1974
1974 establishments in England
Secondary schools in the Borough of Darlington
Academies in the Borough of Darlington
Schools in Darlington